The Huntingdonshire Football Association, also simply known as the Huntingdonshire FA, is the governing body of football in Huntingdonshire.

References

External links
 Huntingdonshire FA's official site

County football associations
Football in Cambridgeshire